"Without You" is a power ballad by American heavy metal band Mötley Crüe. It was originally released on their 1989 album, Dr. Feelgood.

Background
The song features Mick Mars playing a steel guitar during the intro and the solo, a clean electric guitar arpeggio on the verses and bridge, and various licks on a distorted electric guitar throughout. In the Dr. Feelgood album's liner notes, the composition is said to be about Tommy Lee's relationship with Heather Locklear.

Music video
The music video was shot at the Grand 1894 Opera House in Galveston, Texas on January 15, 1990, following Mötley Crüe's Houston concert. Produced by Sharon Oreck through O Pictures and photographed by Bill Pope, "Without You" is the first of two Crüe videos to be directed by Mary Lambert under the alias "Blanche White" ("blanche" meaning "white" in French). Lambert's original idea for the video was "to do a motorcycle movie" but Mötley Crüe objected, as they had done that before (in the music video for "Girls, Girls, Girls"). The final clip, which was described by Nikki Sixx as having a very "surreal" touch to it, includes various abstract images, a live jaguar (Czar from the Exotic Cat Refuge and Wildlife Orphanage in Kirbyville), a violin ensemble playing during the slide solo, and the band playing in an Ancient Egypt-fashioned scenario. Traces of Persian cultural tradition are present in the last few seconds of the studio release.

Personnel
 Vince Neil - vocals
 Mick Mars - guitar
 Nikki Sixx - bass
 Tommy Lee - drums

Chart positions
Released as the album's third single in 1990, "Without You" reached #8 on the Billboard Hot 100 charts in the United States, #11 on the Mainstream Rock Chart, and #39 on the UK Singles Chart.

Weekly charts

Year-end charts

References

1989 songs
1990 singles
Mötley Crüe songs
Songs written by Nikki Sixx
Songs written by Mick Mars
Song recordings produced by Bob Rock
Glam metal ballads
Elektra Records singles
1980s ballads